Simon Marcheford (also Marchand) (fl. 1400s - 1440s) was a Canon of Windsor from 1407 to 1441.

Career

He was appointed:
Prebendary of South Alton in Salisbury 1407
Prebendary of Stow-in-Lindsay in Lincoln 1411 - 1415
Prebendary of Middleton in Chichester 1412 - 1415
Precentor of St George's Chapel, Windsor Castle 1416 - 1417 and 1429 - 1431
Steward of St George's Chapel, Windsor Castle 1424 - 1425

He was appointed to the ninth stall in St George's Chapel, Windsor Castle in 1407 and held the canonry until 1441.

Notes 

Canons of Windsor